Watertown High School (WHS) is a high school located in Watertown, Wisconsin, in Dodge County. It serves grades nine through twelve. The school is operated by the  Watertown Unified School District.

The last high school was overcrowded and only housed the upper three grades. At the time the freshman attended Riverside Junior High School, which is now known as Riverside Middle School. There were many possible locations that were looked at for build sites, including an area near Watertown Memorial Hospital and another location on Wisconsin Highway 26. The chosen location was the latter of the two. The new high school houses grades 9-12. In 2013, Watertown High School was visited by first lady Michelle Obama to encourage healthy drinking habits.

References 

 Zettel, Jen (September 26, 2012). Testimony begins in termination hearing The Watertown Daily Times (Watertown, Wisconsin) Retrieved 18 October 2012.
 Brazy, David (September 27, 2012). Board terminates principal's contract The Watertown Daily Times (Watertown, Wisconsin) Retrieved 18 October 2012.

External links
 Official site

Public high schools in Wisconsin
Schools in Dodge County, Wisconsin